Devdas is a 1928 silent film based on the Sharat Chandra Chattopadhyay novel, Devdas. It was the first film adaptation of the novel. It was directed by Naresh Mitra who not only acted in the film but was the cinematographer. The film was shot in erstwhile Calcutta in British India.

Cast
 Phani Burma as Devdas
 Tarakbala as Parbati (Paro)
 Parulbala as Chandramukhi

References

External links
 SPICE info
 

1928 films
Devdas films
Indian black-and-white films
Films set in Kolkata
Indian silent films
Films directed by Naresh Mitra
Films about courtesans in India
Films based on Indian novels